Silver Stallion may refer to:
 Silver Stallion (1991 film), a South Korean film
 Silver Stallion (1941 film), an American Western film
 Silver Stallion (song), a 1978 song by Lee Clayton, covered by The Highwaymen

See also
 The Silver Stallion, a novel by James Branch Cabell